Friedrichs-Waisenhaus Rummelsburg was an orphanage and infirmary in Berlin established by Frederick William I of Prussia in 1702.  He donated funds for the maintenance of 300 military orphans in 1719. In 1721 400 and 1728 around 500 children were cared for in the hospital.

A new orphanage was built in Rummelsburg and opened in 1859. A workhouse was built next to it after the Prussian law on compulsory education came into force in 1878.

The building was destroyed in 1943 by air raids.

References

Defunct hospitals in Germany
Medical and health organisations based in Berlin
1702 establishments in the Holy Roman Empire
Buildings and structures in Lichtenberg